Portishead railway station served the town of Portishead, Somerset, England from 1907 to 1940 on the Weston, Clevedon and Portishead Railway.

History 
The station opened on 7 August 1907 by the Weston, Clevedon and Portishead Railway. There was a private siding that served Mustad's Nail Factory. It originally had no platform but one was built out of stone in 1920. The station closed on 20 May 1940.

References 

Disused railway stations in Somerset
Railway stations in Great Britain opened in 1907
Railway stations in Great Britain closed in 1940
1907 establishments in England
1940 disestablishments in England